Bangana behri is a species of cyprinid fish endemic the Mekong basin in Cambodia, Thailand, Laos, and China.

References

Bangana
Fish described in 1937
Taxa named by Henry Weed Fowler